Night Shift is an Irish television music programme. Like its sister show Day Shift, it was one of Channel 6's Irish programme. It was launched with the network on Sunday, 30 March 2006. Night Shift was transmitted late at night and sometimes early on weekend mornings. The show was hosted by Michelle Doherty and featured the alternative music scene. In 2006, Night Shift was voted the favourite music programme by Hot Press magazine readers. The last show aired on 31 December 2008. Channel 6 was replaced by 3e on 1 January 2009.

Despite only airing for two years, the show helped launch many new Irish bands such as Director.

Programme producer Elton Mulally has produced televised coverage of the Choice Music Prize for RTÉ2.

Under Ether
In autumn 2009, RTÉ Two commissioned a follow up show called When Under Ether, hosted by Michelle Doherty and Nightshift producer Elton Mullally. The first series began airing on the 10th of November 2009. A second series, under the altered programme title of just "Under Ether", began broadcasting on the 6th of October 2010.

References

Irish music television shows
2006 Irish television series debuts
2008 Irish television series endings